Pierre du Bois de Dunilac (May 5, 1943 at Herzogenbuchsee (canton of Bern) – June 23, 2007 in Pully), was a Swiss writer, political scientist, philanthropist and humanist.

Biography
After studying in Paris with masters like Fernand Braudel, Le Roy Ladurie, and especially Louis Aragon and Elsa Triolet, with whom he became friends he continued an academic career in Switzerland after earning his doctorate in letters to University of Lausanne. Thus he became from 1980 to 1992 professor at the Graduate Institute of European Studies in Geneva, founded in 1963 by Denis de Rougemont, associate professor at the University of Neuchatel, and a professor at the Graduate Institute of International Studies from 1992 to his death.

His main topics of research in the humanities were European integration, the problem of East-West relations and the role of Switzerland in the chessboard of the world and its relations and interactions with him.

As he himself said in an interview with Swiss television, his cosmopolitan origins predisposed to this type of education and openness to the world, he says: "I am a very complicated Switzerland to tell the truth [...] and also to add to the complication, my mother is of Dutch origin, the mother of my father was Belgian and my father was born in Germany, Switzerland I am a true and a true European ".

Pierre du Bois Foundation for Contemporary History
At his death, his widow Irina du Bois de Dunilac created, according to the wishes of her late husband, the "Foundation Pierre du Bois" whose purpose is to stimulate and support research on the history of the present time, European and global. This foundation is especially available a scholarship to encourage and support a doctoral dissertation in the field of history of our time.

On Monday, December 8, 2008, Mr. Pascal Couchepin, President of the Swiss Confederation has launched the Foundation at the Institute of International Studies and Development.

On this occasion, Pascal Couchepin spoke about "the politician and the news". He remembered Pierre du Bois and the friendship that bound them for almost half a century, highlighting its culture and elegance, and his love for discussion and to discover new things.

Any publications
"Musique tsigane et civilisation du divertissement", Cadmos (cahiers trimestriels de l'Institut universitaire d'études européennes de Genève et du Centre européen de la culture), 1979, p. 62-86.
Les mythologies de la Belle Époque : La Chaux-de-Fonds, André Evard et l'Art Nouveau, Lausanne, 1975, W.Suter, 1975, 34 p.
Drieu La Rochelle. Une vie, Lausanne, 1978.
Union et division des Suisses, Lausanne, 1983.
L'AELE d'hier à demain, Genève, 1987.
La Suisse et le défi européen 1945-1992, Lausanne, 1989.
La Suisse et l'Espace économique européen, Lausanne, L'Âge d'Homme, 1992.
Ancheta asupra unei ascensiuni. Ceausescu le putere, Bucarest, 1998.
Histoire de l'Europe monétaire, Paris, PUF, 2008.

References

External links
Site of the foundation Pierre du Bois de Dunilac
Biography

20th-century Swiss historians
Swiss male writers
Swiss philanthropists
Academic staff of the Graduate Institute of International and Development Studies
1943 births
Writers from Bern
2007 deaths
20th-century philanthropists